The 2018 Asian Men's Youth Handball Championship was the 8th edition of the championship held from 16 to 26 September 2018 at Amman (Jordan) under the aegis of Asian Handball Federation. It was the third time in history that championship was organised in Jordan by the Jordan Handball Federation. The top four teams qualified for the 2019 Men's Youth World Handball Championship to be held in Republic of Macedonia.

Draw
The draw was held on 28 April 2018 in Amman, Jordan.

Teams were seeded according to the AHF Competition regulations and rankings of the previous edition of the championship. Teams who had not participate in the previous edition were in Pot 4.

Uzbekistan and Palestine withdrew from the tournament after the draw.

Preliminary round
All times are local (UTC+3).

Group A

Group B

Group C

Group D

8–12th placement matches

Group III

Main round

Group I

Group II

Knockout stage

Bracket

Fifth place game

Semifinals

Third place game

Final

Final standings

References

External links

International handball competitions hosted by Jordan
Asia
Asian Handball Championships
2018 in Jordanian sport
Asian Men's Youth Handball Championship
Asian Men's Youth Handball Championship
Sports competitions in Amman